The 2007 FIBA Africa Championship for Women was the 18th FIBA Africa Championship for Women, played under the rules of FIBA, the world governing body for basketball, and the FIBA Africa thereof. The tournament was hosted by Senegal from September 20 to 30, with the games played at the Marius Ndiaye Stadium in Dakar and at the Stade Maniang Soumaré in Thiès.

Mali defeated Senegal 65–58 in the final to win their first title. and securing a spot at the 2008 Summer Olympics.

Squads

Draw

Preliminary round 
Times given below are in UTC.

Group A

Group B

Knockout stage

9-12th place bracket

9-12th place

11th place match

9th place match

5th place bracket

5-8th place

7th place match

5th place match

Championship bracket

Quarterfinals

Semifinals

Bronze medal match

Final

Final standings

Mali rosterAdizatou Maiga, Aminata Sininta, Djene Diawara, Fanta Toure, Fatoumata Bagayoko, Haoua Sangare, Hamchétou Maïga, Kadia Sacko, Kadia Touré, Kadiatou Kanoute, Naignouma Coulibaly, Nare Diawara, Coach:

Awards

All-Tournament Team
  Hamchétou Maïga
  Crispina Correia
  Djene Diawara
  Carla Silva
  Aya Traoré

Statistical Leaders

Individual Tournament Highs

Points

Rebounds

Assists

Steals

Blocks

Minutes

Individual Game Highs

Team Tournament Highs

Points per Game

Total Points

Rebounds

Assists

Steals

Blocks

2-point field goal percentage

3-point field goal percentage

Free throw percentage

Team Game highs

See also
 2007 FIBA Africa Women's Clubs Champions Cup

External links
Official Website

References

2007
2007 in women's basketball
2007 in Senegalese sport
2007 in African basketball
International women's basketball competitions hosted by Senegal